Grace Davies may refer to:
Grace Barnsley (1896–1975), English pottery decorator, who also used her married name Grace Davies
Grace Davies (singer) (born 1997), runner-up in The X Factor (UK) series 14 (2017)